WMEX-LP (105.9 FM, "105.9 WMEX") is a radio station licensed to serve the community of Rochester, New Hampshire. The station is owned by Rochester Radio and airs an oldies format.

The station was assigned the call sign WMVI-LP by the Federal Communications Commission on May 20, 2014. The station changed its call sign to WMEX-LP just eight days later.

References

External links
 
 FCC Public Inspection File for WMEX-LP
 

MEX-LP
MEX-LP
Radio stations established in 2014
2014 establishments in New Hampshire
Oldies radio stations in the United States
Strafford County, New Hampshire